Philodoria nigrelloides is a moth of the family Gracillariidae. It was first described by Otto Swezey in 1946. It is endemic to the Hawaiian island of Kauai.

The larvae feed on Dubautia species. They mine the leaves of their host plant.

External links

Philodoria
Endemic moths of Hawaii